This is a list of notable Italian writers, including novelists, essayists, poets, and other people whose primary artistic output was literature.

A
 Crescenzo Alatri (1825-1897)
 Attilio Albergoni (born 1949)
 Sibilla Aleramo (1876–1960)
 Vittorio Alfieri (1749–1803)
 Dante Alighieri (1265–1321)
 Magdi Allam (born 1951)
 Ernesto Aloia (born 1965)
 Corrado Alvaro (1895–1956)
 Pasquale Amati (1726–1792)
 Niccolò Ammaniti (born 1966)
 Elisa S. Amore (born 1984)
 Cecco Angiolieri (13th century)
 Giulio Angioni (1939–2017)
 Andrea da Grosseto (13th century)
 Ludovico Ariosto (1474–1533)
 Giovanni Arpino (1927–1987)
 Antonia Arslan (born 1938)
 Devorà Ascarelli (16th century)

B
 Emma Baeri (born 1942)
 Andrea Bajani(born 1975)
 Alfredo Balducci (1920–2011)
 Barbara Baraldi
 Ermolao Barbaro (1454–1493)
 Ermolao Barbaro (bishop) (1410–1474) 
 Francesco Barbaro (1390–1454)
 Giosafat Barbaro (1413–1494)
 Marco Barbaro (1511–1570)
 Alessandro Baricco (born 1958)
 Giorgio Bassani (1916–2000)
 Cesare Beccaria (1738–1794)
 Stefano Benni (born 1947)
 Pietro Bembo (1470–1547)
 Mario Benzing (1896–1958)
 Giuseppe Berto (1914–1978)
 Enzo Bettiza (1927–2017)
 Enzo Biagi (1920–2007)
 Luciano Bianciardi (1922–1971)
 Luther Blissett (born 1958)
 Giovanni Boccaccio (1313–1375)
 Matteo Maria Boiardo (1434–1494)
 Arrigo Boito (1842–1918)
 Camillo Boito (1836–1914)
 Franco Bolelli (1950–2020)
 Vitaliano Brancati (1907–1954)
 Enrico Brizzi (born 1974)
 Giordano Bruno (1548–1600)
 Gesualdo Bufalino (1920–1996)
 Aldo Busi (born 1948)
 Dino Buzzati (1906–1972)

C
 Achille Giovanni Cagna (1847–1931)
 Roberto Calasso (1941–2021)
 Italo Calvino (1923–1985)
 Andrea Camilleri (1925–2019)
 Dino Campana (1885–1932)
 Manuela Campanelli (born 1962)
 Achille Campanile (1899–1977)
 Luigi Capuana (1839–1915)
 Enrichetta Caracciolo (1821–1901)
 Alberto Caramella (1928–2007)
 Giosuè Carducci (1835–1907)
 Nadia Cavalera (born 1950)
 Gianni Celati (1937–2022)
 Benvenuto Cellini (1500–1571) 
 Vincenzo Cerami (1940–2013)
 Guido Cervo (born 1952)
 Saveria Chemotti (born 1947)
 John Ciardi (1916–1986)
 Pietro Citati (1930–2022)
 Carlo Collodi (1826–1890)
 Vincenzo Consolo (1933–2012)
 Matteo Corradini (born 1975)
 Benedetto Croce (1866–1952)

D
 Jacobus de Voragine (1230 - 1298)
 Jacopone da Todi (1230 - 1306)
 Gabriele D'Annunzio (1863–1938)
 Massimo D'Azeglio (1798–1866)
 Edmondo De Amicis (1846–1908) 
 Giacomo Debenedetti (1901–1967)
 Andrea De Carlo (born 1952)
 Grazia Deledda (1871–1936)
 Massimo del Pizzo (born - )
 Silvana De Mari (born 1953)
 Sergio De Santis (born 1953)
 Raffaella de' Sernigi (1473–1557)
 Paola Drigo (1876–1938)

E
 Umberto Eco (1932–2016)
 Muzi Epifani (1935–1984)
 Valerio Evangelisti (born 1952)
 Julius Evola (1898–1974)

F
 Francesco Falconi (born 1976)
 Giorgio Faletti (1950–2014)
 Oriana Fallaci (1929–2006) 
 Beppe Fenoglio (1922–1963)
 Ennio Flaiano (1910–1972)
 Dario Fo (1926–2016)
 Marcello Fois (born 1960)
 Antonio Fogazzaro (1842–1911)
 Ugo Foscolo (1778–1827)
 Bruno Forte (born 1949)
 Carlo Fruttero (1926–2012)

G
 Carlo Emilio Gadda (1893–1973)
 Barbara Gallavotti (born 1968) 
 Natalia Ginzburg (1916–1991)
 Paolo Giordano (born 1982)
 Cinzia Giorgio (born 1975)
 Raffaello Giovagnoli (1838–1915)
 Guglielmo il Giuggiola (16th century)
 Giambattista Giraldi Cinzio (1504–1573)
 Carlo Goldoni (1707–1793)
 Corrado Govoni (1884-1965)
 Guido Gozzano (1883–1916)
 Giovanni Guareschi (1908–1968)
 Robert "Bobby" Germaine (1925–1986)
 Tonino Guerra (1920–2012)

H
 Petrus Haedus (1427–1504)

I
Ibn Hamdis (1056 - 1133)

J
 Fleur Jaeggy (born 1940)

L
 Tommaso Landolfi (1908–1979)
 Brunetto Latini (1220–1294)
 Bruno Leoni (1913–1967)
 Giacomo Leopardi (1798–1837)
Menotti Lerro (born 1980)
Franco Loi (1930-2021)
 Carlo Levi (1902–1975)
 Primo Levi (1919–1987)
 Giuseppe Lombardo Radice 1879-1938) 
 Carlo Lucarelli (born 1960)
 Emilio Lussu (1890–1975)

M
 Niccolò Machiavelli (1469–1527)
 Alessandra Macinghi Strozzi (1406–1471)
 Claudio Magris (born 1939)
 Maria Majocchi (1864–1917)
 Clementina Laura Majocchi (1866–1945)
 Curzio Malaparte (1898–1957)
 Marco Malvaldi (born 1974)
 Valerio Massimo Manfredi (born 1943)
 Giorgio Manganelli (1922 - 1990) 
 Fabio Maniscalco (1965–2008)
 Gianna Manzini (1896–1974)
 Alessandro Manzoni (1785–1873)
 Dacia Maraini (born 1936)
 Fosco Maraini (1912–2004)
 Diego Marani (born 1959)
 Lucrezia Marinella (1571–1653)
 Stefano Massini (born 1975)
 Chiara Matraini (1515–1604)
 Margaret Mazzantini (born 1961) 
 Carlo Mazzoni (born 1979)
 Melania Mazzucco (born 1966)
 Fulvio Melia (born 1956)
 Maria Messina (1887–1944)
 Franco Mimmi (born 1942)
 Federico Moccia (born 1963)
 Grazyna Miller (1957–2009)
 Massimo Mongai (1950–2016)
 Valeria Montaldi (born 19??)
 Eugenio Montale (1896–1981)
 Maria Montessori (1870–1952)
 Beatrice Monroy (born 1953)
 Giuliana Morandini (1938–2019)
 Elsa Morante (1912–1985)
 Marta Morazzoni (born 1950)
 Olympia Morata (1526–1555)
 Alberto Moravia (1907–1990)
 Antonio Moresco (born 1947)

N
Neera (Anna Radius Zuccari) (1846–1918)
Ada Negri (1870–1945)
Ippolito Nievo (1831–1861)

P
 Aldo Palazzeschi (1885–1974)
 Giancarlo Pallavicini (born 1931)
 Angeliki Palli (1798–1875)
 Melissa Panarello (born 1985)
 Giovanni Papini (1881–1956)
 Giovanni Pascoli (1855-1912)
 Pier Paolo Pasolini (1922–1975)
 Cesare Pavese (1908–1950) 
 Roberto Pazzi (born 1946)
 Silvio Pellico (1789–1854)
 Danilo Pennone (born 1963)
 Frank Peretti (born 1951)
 Giovanni Pico della Mirandola (1463–1494)
 Tommaso Pincio
 Luigi Pirandello (1867–1936)
 Fernanda Pivano (1917–2009)
 Joseph Pivato (born 1946)
 Angelo Poliziano (1454–1494)
 Marco Polo (1254–1324)
 Vasco Pratolini (1913–1991)
 Hugo Pratt (1927–1995)
 Mario Praz (1896–1982)
 Ottavio Profeta (1890–1963)
 Luigi Pulci (1432–1484)

Q
Roberto Quaglia (born 1962)
Salvatore Quasimodo (1901–1968)

R
 Lidia Ravera (born 1951)
Mario Rigoni Stern (1921–2008)
 Gianni Rodari (1920–1980)
Lalla Romano (1906–2001)
Emanuela Da Ros (born 1959)

S
 Umberto Saba (1883–1957) 
 Emilio Salgari (1862–1911)
 Rubino Romeo Salmonì (1920–2011)
 Emilia Salvioni (1895–1967)
 Alberto Savinio (1891–1952)
 Leonardo Sciascia (1921–1989)
 Matilde Serao (1856–1927)
 Beppe Severgnini (born 1956)
 Ignazio Silone (1900–1978)
 Mario Soldati (1906–1999)
 Mario Spezi (1945–2016)
 Italo Svevo (1861–1928)
 Roberto Saviano (born 1979)

T
 Antonio Tabucchi (1943–2012)
 Susanna Tamaro (born 1957)
 Torquato Tasso (1544–1595) 
 Tiziano Terzani (1938–2004)
 Roberto Tiraboschi (born 1951)
 Giuseppe Tomasi di Lampedusa (1896–1957)
 Fulvio Tomizza (1935–1999)
 Pier Vittorio Tondelli (1955–1991)
 Marco Travaglio (born 1964)

U
 Luigi Ugolini (1891–1980)
 Giuseppe Ungaretti (1888–1970)

V
 Giorgio van Straten (born 1955) 
 Giovanni Verga (1840–1922)
 Grazia Verasani (born 1964), crime writer
 Giuseppe Vergani
 Sandro Veronesi (born 1959)
 Anna Vertua Gentile (1850–1926)
 Mitì Vigliero Lami (born 1957)
 Simona Vinci (born 1970)
 Ottavia Vitagliano (1894–1975)
 Elio Vittorini (1908–1966)
 Paolo Volponi (1924-1994)

W
 Wu Ming

Z
 Enrica Zunic'

See also
List of Italian women writers
Italian literature
List of Italian language poets
Lists of authors

References

Italian
 
Writers
Italian literature-related lists